Hendrika is a Dutch feminine given name, derived from the male name Hendrik ("Henry"). Most people with the name use short forms in daily life, like Henda (in Afrikaans), Hennie, Henny, Hetty, Ria, Rie, Riek and Rika. Hendrika can refer to:

 Hendrika B. Cantwell (born 1925), Dutch-American clinical professor of pediatrics, advocate for abused and neglected children
 Hendrika C. "Rie" de Balbian Verster (1890–1990), Dutch painter
 Hendrika Margaretha "Hetty" van Gurp (born 1949), Dutch-born Canadian educator
 Hendrika Hofhuis (1780–1849), last Dutch woman to (by her request) be put on trial for witch craft
 Hendrika A.M. "Ria" van der Horst (born 1932), Dutch swimmer
 Hendrika Johanna van Leeuwen (1887–1974), Dutch physicist
 Hendrika W. "Rie" Mastenbroek (1919–2003), Dutch swimmer
 Hendrika "Hennie" Penterman (born 1951), Dutch swimmer
 Hendrika A. "Riek" van Rumt (1897–1985), Dutch gymnast
 G. Hendrika "Riek" Schagen (1913–2008), Dutch actress
 Hendrika Cornelia Scott "Henda" Swart (1939–2016), South African mathematician
 Hendrika C.M. "Ria" Vedder-Wubben (1951–2016), Dutch politician
 P. Hendrika "Henny" Vegter (born 1958), Dutch Olympic sailor
 Hendrika "Hennie" van der Velde (born 1944), Dutch swimmer

See also 
 7840 Hendrika, a main belt asteroid named after the discoverer's wife

Dutch feminine given names